Ketu or KETU may refer to:

Places 
 Ketu (Benin), a historical location in present-day Benin
 Ketu, Nigeria
 Ketu Municipal District, in Ghana
 Ketu railway station, in China
 Ketu, another name for the mountain K2 on the China–Pakistan border

Other uses 
 Ketu (mythology), a god in Hinduism
 KETU, an American radio station
 Candomblé Ketu, a branch of the Candomblé religion of South America
 Lesley Ketu (born 1987), New Zealand rugby union player

See also
 Kétou, Benin, a town